Domina Cleophas Jalbert (1904–1991) invented the ram-air inflated flexible wing, often called the "Jalbert parafoil".

Personal life
Domina Jalbert was born in Saint-Jean-de-Matha, Quebec, Canada; his father was Onesime Jalbert (1856–1938) and his mother was Celestine Gouger (1861–1939). He was one of 17 children.  

Early in his life he moved to Woonsocket, Rhode Island, where he lived and worked for many years before moving to Boca Raton, Florida, in his older years. 

While living in Woonsocket, Jalbert graduated from Woonsocket High School, and later worked as a track coach and administrator for Mount St. Charles Academy.

Jalbert received a U.S. pilots' license in 1927. In the 1930s he was active in kiting,  using large kites for advertising purposes. He was hired to help protect the coastline of the western United States during war with the design and making of barrage balloons; he worked for the United States Rubber Company in Naugatuck, Connecticut, USA.

Jalbert later moved to New Jersey and was married in 1933 to champion swimmer Elizabeth Becker, and they had one daughter, Dorothy Christina Jalbert (1932–2006). Elizabeth died in 1936, and Domina returned to Rhode Island.   

Jalbert was married to Emma Rose Bourcier (1903–1994) on October 28, 1943, in Providence, Rhode Island. The couple moved to Belmont, Massachusetts and were living there in 1945. They had one son, Paul Charles Jalbert (1945–1992). 

Jalbert and his family relocated to Boca Raton, Florida in 1950. 

Jalbert died on June 26, 1991 in Boca Raton, Florida.

Major Achievements in Aeronautics
In 1942, Jalbert demonstrated the power of his custom-made kite by lifting his daughter, Dorothy Jalbert, in a "kite-swing" at Point Judith, Rhode Island. 

He filed a patent in 1944 for a combination of a balloon with a stiffened flexible wing,  forming what is now known as a "kytoon". 

In 1956, Jalbert tested his square parachute for the first time in Boca Raton, Florida.  

In 1957, Jalbert invented the ram-air airfoil and began testing and formalizing the design.

In January 1963 he formally confirmed his discovery and invention of the ram-air double-surfaced fully flexible airfoil that would profoundly change kiting, parachuting, skydiving, hang gliding, paragliding, sport flying, power kiting, and more. All parafoils today owe their roots to Jalbert's invention.

In 1964, he filed a patent titled "Multi-cell Wing Type Aerial Device" This would become key to paragliding, sky diving, powered paragliding, landboarding, kite surfing and cargo-ship kite tugging.

In 1971, Jalbert's dream of creating a ram-air parachute was realized.  Working with Jalbert, Theodore Hulsizer, civilian prototype parachute manufacturer for the United States Air Force and NASA (1947–1973), made the first parafoil parachute that worked.  While testing his prototype in the wind tunnel at Wright-Patterson Air Force Base in Dayton, Ohio, USA, Theodore realized its drag was considerably stronger than any other parachute he had tested in his 25 years of experience.  He believed others' attempts ripped to shreds, because of the drag.  To slow the opening of the parafoil, Theodore ran the cords through rings he designed that were slid to the top while packing the parachute.  As it opened, the rings had to slide down, slowing the opening. These rings later evolved to be the slider in modern ram-air parachutes. Theodore personally made the first full-size parafoil, which worked perfectly in its first drop.

1984 –  At age 79 Jalbert traveled to Beijing, China to demonstrate his parafoils.

Ram-air airfoil of fully flexible materials 
Jalbert was first to teach of the robust airfoil formed by the ram-air principle. Every contemporary ram-air airfoil sport and utility wing began with Jalbert's invention.

When the parafoil is used as a gliding parachute, thus opening after the payload or human has been in free-fall, the opening of the parafoil can be very fast; the fast opening and the consequential related shock has to be damped; devices invented by others are used to slow down the opening of the parafoil.  One such invention is the slider. When the parafoil is used in hang gliding as a paraglider, the parafoil is kited open before the human leaves the ground; in such cases a slider is not necessary.

Patents filed
 
Jalbert invented his filed-for January 10, 1963 US Patent 3131894 the Parafoil which had sectioned cells in an aerofoil shape; an open leading edge and a closed trailing edge, inflated by passage through the air – the ram-air design.
Kite Balloon. Filing date: April 15, 1944
Kite Balloon. Filing date: August 31, 1945
2398744 Kite Balloon
Multi-Cell Glide Canopy Parachute D. C. Jalbert
Multi-Cell Wing Type Aerial Device Filing date: October 1, 1964
Multi-Cell Wing Type Aerial Device US Pat. 3285546⁣ – Filed October 1, 1964
Aerial sled Domina C. Jalbert

Awards 
 1986 – Jalbert accepted an award from the Parachute Industry Association.
 1988 – Inducted to the Rhode Island Heritage Hall of Fame. 
 2019 –  Jalbert was posthumously awarded the FAI Gold Air Medal for invention of the multi-cell ram-air wing from the Federation Aeronautique International (World Air Sports Federation).

See also 
Parafoil
Powered parachute
Flexifoil
High altitude wind power

Videos 
Domina Jalbert PIA Award Ceremony 1986

Domina Jalbert -  June 21, 1988: Woonsocket City Hall

Domina Jalbert - WNRI Upfront Show - 1988

References

External links 
Domina Jalbert: Brother of the Wind
Drachen Foundation Domina Jalbert Archives

Aviation inventors
American aviators
1904 births
1991 deaths
Canadian emigrants to the United States